Juan Bautista Quirós Segura (January 18, 1853 – November 7, 1934) was president of Costa Rica for two weeks, from August 12 to September 2, 1919, following the resignation of Federico Tinoco. His government was not recognized by the United States and he was forced to resign.

Family and early life 

Juan Bautista Quirós Segura was born in San Juan de Tibás, Costa Rica on January 18, 1853 to his parents General Pablo Quirós Jiménez and Mercedes Segura Masís. He first married Teresa Aguilar Guzmán (who died in 1899), granddaughter of then head of state Manuel Aguilar Chacón, and on November 4, 1900 he married Clementina Quirós Fonseca (1880–1953), daughter of José Quirós Montero and Florinda Fonseca Guzmán.

Military and private activities 

He pursued a military career and achieved the rank of General in the Costa Rican army. He was also a farmer and entrepreneur, and eventually earned a large capital.

First public offices 

During Rafael Yglesias Castro's second administration he was designated second in line to the presidency and secretary of commerce, war, and navy as well as treasurer.

He later served as deputy, third in line to the presidency, president of the Constitutional Congress, and president of the International Bank of Costa Rica. On August 19, 1919, President Federico Tinoco's fall seemed imminent, Congress named him first in line to the presidency. On August 12, President Tinoco asked him to temporarily hold the office. His first orders were to reestablish all public liberties and to free all political prisoners.

President of the Republic 

He officially took office on August 20, 1919 after Federico Tinoco's resignation was accepted. His period was scheduled to end on May 8, 1923 but, even though his government took a very prudent approach, the United States government refused to recognize him as a legitimate head of state. Being faced with a possible armed intervention, Quirós decided to quit the office and on September 20 was replaced by Francisco Aguilar Barquero.

Other public offices 

He was briefly secretary of war under President Aguilar. During Julio Acosta García's administration, and by Acosta's own recommendation, Congress designated him as the first head of the Control Office, which was in charge of government internal control.

He died in San José on November 7, 1934.

Bibliography 

Jesús Manuel Fernández Morales, Las Presidencias del Castillo Azul (2010)

Ernesto Quirós Aguilar, Los Quirós en Costa Rica (1948)

References 

1853 births
1934 deaths
People from San José Province
Costa Rican people of Spanish descent
Presidents of Costa Rica
Vice presidents of Costa Rica
Defense ministers of Costa Rica
Trade ministers of Costa Rica